Alexander Hesler or Hessler (1823–1895) was an American photographer active in the U.S. state of Illinois.  He is best known for photographing, in 1858 and 1860, definitive iconic images of the beardless Abraham Lincoln.

Biography
Hesler was born in Montreal. He was active in the 1850s and early 1860s, learned daguerrotype and ambrotype photography; however, in company with many of his fellow craftspeople, he was trained in glass plate photography in the 1850s and specialized in it thereafter.  He operated studios in Galena, Chicago and Springfield, Illinois, and took images of people and scenes in Illinois.  Using a portable darkroom, he also produced landscape scenes from nearby states and territories of what is now the American Midwest.

Hesler's known portraits include photographs of the two chief Illinois political figures of his day, Lincoln and federal senator Stephen A. Douglas.  In the 1860 presidential election, Lincoln's friends took steps to have Hesler's images copied and recirculated, cementing their stature as works of Lincoln image-making.

Hesler's portable darkroom work included a widely circulated image of Minnehaha Falls, a waterfall located in what was to become the U.S. city of Minneapolis.

Legacy
Hesler was an award-winning photographer whose goal was to create photographs of lasting artistic value. He was recognized for the quality of both his portrait work and his outdoor photography. Upon Hesler's retirement in 1865, he transferred his Chicago studio and negatives to a fellow photographer, George Bucher Ayres.  Several of Hesler's best-known images of Lincoln are platinum prints produced by Ayres from Hesler negatives.

Hesler's 1860 glass-plate negatives were used after Lincoln's death as bases for further images of the President, including busts by sculptors such as Gutzon Borglum.

Alexander Hesler is buried in Racine, Wisconsin. A short documentary film about Mound Cemetery, where he is buried, will release in 2014 and features a segment on Hesler.

References

External links

American portrait photographers
Pioneers of photography
1823 births
1895 deaths
Abraham Lincoln in art
Photographers from Illinois
Artists from Chicago
People from Springfield, Illinois
19th-century American politicians
19th-century American photographers